Nicholas Fastolf (??? - 1330) was an English-born judge who was a leading member of the early Irish judiciary; according to reliable sources, he was the first judge to hold the office of Lord Chief Justice of Ireland. He was an ancestor of Sir John Fastolf, who is generally thought to have inspired Shakespeare's character Falstaff.

Family
He was born in Norfolk, one of the four sons of Thomas Fastolf of Reedham and Great Yarmouth. His brothers were Thomas Fastolf, Bishop of St David's, Lawrence Fastolf, auditor of the prerogative court of Canterbury, and Alexander, who was twice bailiff of Great Yarmouth.

Nicholas' wife was called Cicely or Cecilia: they had several children. Elrington Ball believed that he was the direct ancestor of Sir John Fastolf. Hugh Fastolf, who was MP for Great Yarmouth from 1361 to 1377, is thought to have been his nephew, a son of his brother Alexander.

Career
He served at least one term as bailiff of Great Yarmouth, and sat as a burgess for Great Yarmouth in the Parliaments of 1309 and 1314 and became a Serjeant-at-law. In 1324 he was sent to Ireland as Lord Chief Justice. Elrington Ball regarded his appointment as a step of great importance in the development of the Irish judiciary, since, while some sources name Walter l'Enfant, in about 1300, as the first Lord Chief Justice of Ireland, Ball believed that Fastolf was the first. He was usually referred to as "the justice following the Justiciar of Ireland". He exchanged the position for that of Chief Justice of the Irish Common Pleas in 1328, but returned to his earlier office the following year. His salary was 40 marks a year. As a special favour the Crown promised him the custody of any heir who became a royal ward, and the right to hold the lands during their minority, if the lands were worth less than £20.

He was granted lands in County Meath: in Dublin he lived in considerable state in a mansion on Rochel Street (now Back Lane) near Dublin Castle, and he made a special contract with the Mayor of Dublin for a private water supply, which involved inserting a narrow pipe into the cistern of his neighbour and fellow judge Walter de Islip. He returned to England in 1330, and is heard of there acting as an itinerant justice, but died soon after 1330; his executors were his widow and his brother Lawrence.

Elrington Ball calls him "a man of wealth and distinction".

References

1330 deaths
People from Great Yarmouth
Year of birth unknown
Lords chief justice of Ireland
Chief Justices of the Irish Common Pleas